The Copa América is South America's major tournament in senior men's soccer and determines the continental champion. Until 1967, the tournament was known as South American Championship. It is the oldest continental championship in the world with its first edition held in 1916.

Uruguay won the inaugural tournament in Argentina, making them the first nation to hold an international football title worldwide. They are the joint-most successful team in tournament history with fifteen titles, tied with their rivals Argentina.

Until 1927, the South American Championship was held annually, and Uruguay were the dominating team during this early era, winning six out of eleven tournaments. Part of all six victorious squads was inside-forward Ángel Romano, who holds the record for most titles and for most tournament participations (9).

Overall record

Winning finals

In the era of the South American Championship, Round Robins were more commonly played than knock-out tournaments. Listed are the decisive matches which secured Uruguay the respective titles.

Record by opponent

Record players

Top goalscorers

Players with multiple titles

* Additionally, José Nasazzi won the title once as head coach of Uruguay in 1942.

Awards and records

Team Awards
 Champions 15x (1916, 1917, 1920, 1923, 1924, 1926, 1935, 1942, 1956, 1959 [ECU], 1967, 1983, 1987, 1995, 2011)
 Second Place 6x (1919, 1927, 1939, 1941, 1989, 1999)
 Third Place 8x (1921, 1922, 1929, 1937, 1947, 1953, 1957, 2004)
 Fair Play Award 1x (2011)

Individual Awards
 MVP 1916: Isabelino Gradín
 MVP 1917: Héctor Scarone
 MVP 1920: José Piendibene
 MVP 1923 and 1935: José Nasazzi
 MVP 1924: Pedro Petrone
 MVP 1926: José Leandro Andrade
 MVP 1942: Obdulio Varela
 MVP 1956: Oscar Míguez
 MVP 1959 [ECU]: Alcides Silveira
 MVP 1967: Pedro Rocha
 MVP 1983 and 1995: Enzo Francéscoli
 MVP 1989: Ruben Sosa
 MVP 2011: Luis Suárez
 Top scorer 1916: Isabelino Gradín (3 goals)
 Top scorer 1917: Ángel Romano (4 goals)
 Top scorer 1920: Ángel Romano and José Pérez (3 goals each) (shared)
 Top scorer 1923: Pedro Petrone (3 goals) (shared)
 Top scorer 1924: Pedro Petrone (4 goals)
 Top scorer 1927: Pedro Petrone, Héctor Scarone and Roberto Figueroa (3 goals each) (shared)
 Top scorer 1946: José María Medina (7 goals)
 Top scorer 1947: Nicolás Falero (8 goals)
 Top scorer 1957: Javier Ambrois (9 goals) (shared)
 Top scorer 1983: Carlos Aguilera (3 goals) (shared)
 Best young player 2011: Sebastián Coates

Team records

 Most titles: 15 (shared with Argentina)
 Most matches played: 201

Individual records

 Most goals in one tournament: Javier Ambrois (9 goals in 1957, shared with Jair in 1949 and Humberto Maschio in 1957)
 Most tournament participations: Ángel Romano (9, 1916–1926)

References

External links
RSSSF archives and results
Soccerway database

 
Countries at the Copa América
Uruguay national football team